Princess Hsinbyume was crown princess of Burma from 1808 to 1812, and first wife of King Bagyidaw of Konbaung dynasty. She married Bagyidaw when he was Prince of Sagaing on 9 February 1803. Hsinbyume and the King Bagyidaw were cousins, as they both were the grandchildren of King Bodawpaya.

Life

Hsinpyume was a daughter of Prince of Pyay Sīridhammarājā (a son of King Bodawpaya) and his consort Princess of Myedu. She was wedded to the 18-year-old Prince of Sagaing on 9 February 1803. Her full regnal title was Sīrisumahācandādevī. She became the Crown Princess when her husband Prince of Sagaing selected as Crown Prince by his grandfather King Bodawpaya in 1808.

In 1812, Hsinbyume died seven days after the birth of Setkya Mintha in Mingun near Ava. The crown prince built a beautiful white stupa in memory of his first wife named Hsinbyume Pagoda at Mingun. He took on five more queens as crown prince (of the eventual number of 23 queens). He was promoted his third wife Me Nu as new Crown Princess and later chief queen when Bagyidaw ascended the throne on 5 June 1819.

Her son, Setkya Mintha was executed by King Tharrawaddy (the successor to his elder brother Bagyidaw) on 4 April 1837.

References

1789 births
1812 deaths
Queens consort of Konbaung dynasty
Konbaung dynasty
Deaths_in_childbirth
18th-century Burmese women
19th-century Burmese women